Sneha Paliyeri also known as Sneha M is a dubbing artist (voice artist) in Malayalam films. She is also a film actress, stage performer, theatre artist and professionally a teacher. She was born in Kannur, a district of Kerala. Her parents, Padmanabhan and Jayanthi, are both teachers. She married Naveen Kumar. She is a post-graduate in physics and a BEd

Career
Paliyeri participated in the youth festival venues of the Kannur University Interzone Youth Festival, with mono act performance for seven years. She also acted in several plays. She appeared in the films Kavi Uddheshichathu..? directed by Thomas Kutty, Vellam  directed by Prajesh Sen, and Thuramukham (2020) directed by Rajeev Ravi.She also appeared in webseries titled Instagraamam.

Filmography
As dubbing artist

Accolades

References

Living people
1993 births
Kerala State Film Award winners
Indian voice actresses
Actresses in Malayalam cinema
Indian film actresses
Actresses from Kannur